Barata may refer to:

Places 
 Barata (Lycaonia), an ancient town in present-day Turkey
 Barata, Kenya, a settlement in Kenya
 , a sub-district of Realengo, Rio de Janeiro, Brazil
 , a river in Svishtov Municipality, Bulgaria

People 
 Ahmed Hassan Barata, Nigerian politician
 Cipriano Barata (1762–1838), Brazilian physician and politician
 Jaime Martins Barata (1899–1970), Portuguese painter and scholar
 José Barata-Moura (born 1948), Portuguese philosopher
 Larissa Barata (born 1987), Brazilian gymnast
 Rodolfo Barata (born 1987), Portuguese footballer
 Samuel Barata (born 1993), Portuguese runner
 Vítor Barata (born 1996), Portuguese footballer
 Lair Paulo Barata Ribeiro, Brazilian footballer

See also 
 
 Bharata (disambiguation)